The Ink and Paint Club may refer to:
The Ink and Paint Club, a group of artists who were employed by Walt Disney
The Ink and Paint Club (TV series) on Disney Channel
The Ink and Paint Club, a fictional night club in Who Framed Roger Rabbit